John McDougall (born 8 December 1900) was a Scottish professional footballer who played as a wing half.

Career statistics
Source:

References

1900 births
Footballers from Hamilton, South Lanarkshire
Scottish footballers
Association football wing halves
Larkhall Thistle F.C. players
Motherwell F.C. players
Port Vale F.C. players
Accrington Stanley F.C. (1891) players
Vale of Leven F.C. players
New Bedford Whalers players
Scottish Football League players
English Football League players
American Soccer League (1921–1933) players
Year of death missing
Scottish expatriate sportspeople in the United States
Expatriate soccer players in the United States
Scottish expatriate footballers